Shen Weichen (born May 12, 1956) is a former Chinese politician from Shanxi province. During his career he served as the Communist Party Secretary of the city of Jinzhong in Shanxi province, the director of propaganda of Shanxi province, and the Party Secretary of Taiyuan, the provincial capital. In September 2010 Shen was transferred to work for the Central Propaganda Department of the Communist Party under Liu Yunshan.

After the 18th Party Congress, Shen became a leading figure in the China Association for Science and Technology. He was removed from office in April 2014 by the Central Commission for Discipline Inspection (CCDI); Shen himself was a member of the CCDI. His downfall was notable for the CCDI investigating 'one of their own.' He was sentenced to life in prison in 2016.

Career
Shen was born and raised in Lucheng County, Shanxi province. Shen entered Shanxi University in April 1972, majoring in physical education, where he graduated in December 1975.

Shen became involved in politics in August 1969 and joined the Chinese Communist Party in January 1979.

Shen rose through the ranks to become the CPC Party Secretary of Jinzhong in May 2000. That same year, he was elevated to head the Shanxi Provincial Propaganda Department of the Communist Party.

In January 2006, Shen was transferred to Taiyuan, capital of Shanxi Province, and he was appointed the Party Secretary of Taiyuan, a position he held until September 2010. According to Chinese-language media, locals appraisal of Shen's time at the helm of the provincial capital was summed up with the line, "he sold a lot of land, filmed a tv show, and slept with a bunch of women." Shen was allegedly involved in a relationship with a prominent singer from Shanxi province (she was not named in reports). The province's richest man, Zhang Xinming, was reported to have given 5 million yuan (~$812,000) to one of the singer's concerts in order to curry favour with Shen.

In September 2010, Shen was transferred to Beijing and appointed the Deputy Director of the Propaganda Department of the Chinese Communist Party, working as the assistant to then-Director Liu Yunshan. He remained in that position until April 2013, when he was promoted to become the Party Group Secretary of China Association for Science and Technology, the largest civic organization overseeing work in science and technology in China with a membership of over 430,000. At the 18th Party Congress Shen was also elected as a member of the 18th Central Commission for Discipline Inspection.

Downfall
In February 2014, Shen's former colleague Jin Daoming, then the Vice-Chairman of the Shanxi Provincial People's Congress, was held for investigation. It was reported that Jin gave evidence that implicated Shen in corruption. On April 12, 2014, Shen was being investigated by the Central Commission for Discipline Inspection for "serious violations of laws and regulations". Shen is the first provincial-ministerial official to be implicated in 2014 as part of the massive anti-corruption campaign following the 18th National Congress of the Chinese Communist Party. He was also the first member of the 18th CCDI itself that was investigated for corruption.

In December 2014, Shen was expelled from the Chinese Communist Party. The party investigation concluded that Shen "abused his power for the illicit gain of others, took massive bribes, received gifts of cash, and committed adultery." His case was forwarded to judicial authorities for prosecution. Shen was sentenced for life in prison for bribery on October 11, 2016.

Personal life

Shen spent much of his career in sports administration, and excelled at sports. He was known to be warm, good-looking, and extraordinarily talkative, often giving lengthy speeches at meetings. Shen was fond of Shanxi history, and was instrumental in planning and filming the 2006 television series Qiao's Grand Courtyard, as well as the series Eighth Route Army and Luliang Heroes.

References

External links

1956 births
Politicians from Changzhi
Shanxi University alumni
Living people
Chinese Communist Party politicians from Shanxi
People's Republic of China politicians from Shanxi
Chinese politicians convicted of corruption